Multichannel News is a magazine and website published by Future US that covers multichannel television and communications providers, such as cable operators, satellite television firms and telephone companies, as well as emerging Internet video and communication services.

History and profile
Multichannel News was founded by Fairchild Publications and Paul Maxwell. Its first issue was published on September 15, 1980.

The Walt Disney Company owned the magazine for a year after acquiring Fairchild parent Capital Cities/ABC, then sold it to Cahners Business Information, part of Reed Elsevier. In 2009, owner Reed Business Information sold Twice, Broadcasting & Cable and Multichannel News to NewBay Media. Future acquired NewBay Media in 2018.

Multichannel News reaches over 18,000 industry professionals in the cable television business and has an editorial focus on programming, advertising, marketing, finance, technology, broadband, and government activities for the worldwide cable television and telecommunications industries. Its readers include executives with cable television networks, cable multiple system operators (MSOs), independent cable system operators, satellite-TV and wireless companies, telecom companies, and suppliers of technology equipment for the cable industry. Multichannel News has exclusive partnerships with trade associations and develops awards recognizing achievements in the television business.

References

External links
 

1980 establishments in Colorado
News magazines published in the United States
Science and technology magazines published in the United States
Magazines about the media
Magazines established in 1980
Magazines published in Colorado
Professional and trade magazines